ASC Games (abbreviated from American Softworks Corporation) was an American video game publisher founded in 1992. Formerly based in Darien, Connecticut, the company quickly became a major publisher for games on the Nintendo Entertainment System, Super Nintendo Entertainment System and Sega Genesis.

The company eventually shut down on January 7, 2000, due to the financial issues that came with the ongoing delay of their upcoming game, Werewolf: The Apocalypse – The Heart of Gaia, which was in development by BetaSoft Games.

Games Published  
 Grand Theft Auto for MS-DOS and Microsoft Windows in North America.
 TNN Bass Tournament of Champions for Super Nintendo Entertainment System and Sega Genesis in North America.
 Sanitarium for Microsoft Windows in North America and Europe.
 Super Troll Islands for Super Nintendo Entertainment System in North America and Europe.
 Ten Pin Alley for Sony PlayStation in North America.
 TNN Outdoors Pro Hunter 1 & 2 for Microsoft Windows in North America.

References

External links 
  (archived)
 

Companies based in Fairfield County, Connecticut
Video game companies established in 1992
Video game companies disestablished in 2000
1992 establishments in Connecticut
2000 disestablishments in Connecticut
Defunct video game companies of the United States
Video game publishers
Defunct companies based in Connecticut
Darien, Connecticut